The women's 3000 metre relay in short track speed skating at the 2014 Winter Olympics was held between 10–18 February 2014 at the Iceberg Skating Palace in Sochi, Russia.

The semifinal was held on 10 February with the final on 18 February.

The defending Olympic Champion and World Champion was China.

Qualification
Countries were assigned quotas using a combination of the four special Olympic Qualification classifications that were held at two world cups in November 2013. For this event a total of 8 nations qualified to compete.

Results

Semifinals
The semifinals were held on 10 February.

Finals
The finals were held on 18 February.

Final B (Classification Round)

Final A (Medal Round)

References

Women's short track speed skating at the 2014 Winter Olympics